Derwenthaugh railway station served the village of Swalwell, Tyne and Wear, England from 1836 to 1868 on the Newcastle and Carlisle Railway.

History 
The station opened in 1836 by the Newcastle and Carlisle Railway. It closed in August 1850 but reopened in November 1852 before closing permanently in 1868.

References 

Disused railway stations in Tyne and Wear
Railway stations in Great Britain opened in 1836
Railway stations in Great Britain closed in 1868
1836 establishments in England
1868 disestablishments in England